Gynnidomorpha curviphalla is a species of moth of the family Tortricidae. It is found in China (Beijing, Guizhou, Hebei, Henan, Tianjin).

The wingspan is 12−13 mm. The ground colour of the forewings is pale yellowish brown, with small brownish-black dots along both the costal and dorsal margins. The hindwings are greyish brown.

Etymology
The species name refers to the curved phallus and is derived from the Latin prefix curv- (meaning curved) and phallus.

References

Moths described in 2013
Cochylini